The 1995–96 NBA season was the Pistons' 48th season in the National Basketball Association, and 39th season in the city of Detroit. During the off-season, the Pistons hired Doug Collins as head coach, while acquiring Otis Thorpe from the Portland Trail Blazers; Thorpe won a championship as a member of the Houston Rockets in the 1994 NBA Finals. Under Collins, the Pistons, who were now led by second-year star Grant Hill and Allan Houston, struggled with a 5–9 record in November, but played .500 basketball for the remainder of the season, holding a 23–22 record at the All-Star break. At midseason, the team signed free agent Michael Curry, who was previously released by the Washington Bullets. The Pistons reemerged as a playoff contender finishing fifth in the Central Division with a 46–36 record, and returned to the playoffs after a three-year absence.

Hill led the team with 20.2 points, 9.8 rebounds, 6.9 assists and 1.3 steals per game, and was named to the All-NBA Second Team, and selected for the 1996 NBA All-Star Game. In addition, Houston finished second on the team in scoring averaging 19.7 points per game, and led them with 191 three-point field goals, while Thorpe provided the team with 14.2 points and 8.4 rebounds per game. Joe Dumars played half of the season off the bench as the team's sixth man, averaging just 11.8 points and 4.0 assists per game, as Lindsey Hunter was the team's starting point guard for half the season, contributing 8.5 points per game, and Terry Mills provided with 9.4 points and 4.3 rebounds per game off the bench. On the defensive side, top draft pick Theo Ratliff led the team with 1.5 blocks per game off the bench, and second round draft pick Don Reid was the team's starting power forward, averaging 3.8 points and 2.9 rebounds per game. Hill also finished tied in ninth place in Most Valuable Player voting, while Collins finished tied in third place in Coach of the Year voting,

However, in the Eastern Conference First Round of the playoffs, the Pistons would be swept by the Orlando Magic in three straight games. Following the season, Houston signed as a free agent with the New York Knicks, which left a bitter feud between Houston's and Hill's relationship, and Mark West signed with the Cleveland Cavaliers.

During a road game against the Magic on March 20, 1996, and with the Magic up by 20 points against the Pistons, Magic reverse guard Anthony Bowie called a timeout with 2.7 seconds left to set up a play, so he could get his first career triple-double. Collins was upset about this, and ordered his players off the court to the locker room before the game had ended. Collins was fined $5,000 by the league, as the Magic defeated the Pistons, 113–91.

Draft picks

Roster

Regular season

Season standings

z – clinched division title
y – clinched division title
x – clinched playoff spot

Record vs. opponents

Game log

Regular season

|- align="center" bgcolor="#ffcccc"
| 1
| November 3
| New York
| L 100–106
|
|
|
| The Palace of Auburn Hills
| 0–1
|- align="center" bgcolor="#ccffcc"
| 4
| November 8
| Portland
| W 107–100 (OT)
|
|
|
| The Palace of Auburn Hills
| 1–3
|- align="center" bgcolor="#ccffcc"
| 5
| November 10
| Cleveland
| W 100–80
|
|
|
| The Palace of Auburn Hills
| 2–3
|- align="center" bgcolor="#ccffcc"
| 6
| November 15
| Seattle
| W 94–87
|
|
|
| The Palace of Auburn Hills
| 3–3
|- align="center" bgcolor="#ffcccc"
| 7
| November 17
| Utah
| L 81–86
|
|
|
| The Palace of Auburn Hills
| 3–4
|- align="center" bgcolor="#ffcccc"
| 8
| November 18
| @ Cleveland
| L 90–93
|
|
|
| Gund Arena
| 3–5
|- align="center" bgcolor="#ccffcc"
| 11
| November 26
| Houston
| W 102–100
|
|
|
| The Palace of Auburn Hills
| 5–6
|- align="center" bgcolor="#ffcccc"
| 12
| November 27
| @ Orlando
| L 95–96
|
|
|
| Orlando Arena
| 5–7
|- align="center" bgcolor="#ffcccc"
| 14
| November 30
| Miami
| L 107–118
|
|
|
| The Palace of Auburn Hills
| 5–9

|- align="center" bgcolor="#ccffcc"
| 15
| December 2
| Atlanta
| W 104–96
|
|
|
| The Palace of Auburn Hills
| 6–9
|- align="center" bgcolor="#ffcccc"
| 19
| December 10
| @ L.A. Lakers
| L 82–87
|
|
|
| Great Western Forum
| 8–11
|- align="center" bgcolor="#ffcccc"
| 20
| December 13
| L.A. Lakers
| L 98–101
|
|
|
| The Palace of Auburn Hills
| 8–12
|- align="center" bgcolor="#ffcccc"
| 22
| December 16
| @ New York
| L 82–86
|
|
|
| Madison Square Garden
| 9–13
|- align="center" bgcolor="#ccffcc"
| 25
| December 22
| @ Miami
| W 84–75
|
|
|
| Miami Arena
| 12–13
|- align="center" bgcolor="#ffcccc"
| 26
| December 23
| Orlando
| L 79–94
|
|
|
| The Palace of Auburn Hills
| 12–14

|- align="center" bgcolor="#ffcccc"
| 34
| January 15
| @ Atlanta
| L 88–96
|
|
|
| The Omni
| 19–15
|- align="center" bgcolor="#ccffcc"
| 35
| January 18
| San Antonio
| W 100–98
|
|
|
| The Palace of Auburn Hills
| 19–16
|- align="center" bgcolor="#ffcccc"
| 36
| January 19
| @ Indiana
| L 81–89
|
|
|
| Market Square Arena
| 19–17
|- align="center" bgcolor="#ffcccc"
| 37
| January 21
| Chicago
| L 96–111
|
|
|
| The Palace of Auburn Hills
| 19–18
|- align="center" bgcolor="#ccffcc"
| 38
| January 24
| @ San Antonio
| W 85–84
|
|
|
| Alamodome
| 20–18
|- align="center" bgcolor="#ffcccc"
| 40
| January 27
| @ Houston
| L 85–105
|
|
|
| The Summit
| 21–19
|- align="center" bgcolor="#ffcccc"
| 41
| January 29
| @ Utah
| L 97–106
|
|
|
| Delta Center
| 21–20

|- align="center" bgcolor="#ccffcc"
| 42
| February 1
| Indiana
| W 87–70
|
|
|
| The Palace of Auburn Hills
| 22–20
|- align="center" bgcolor="#ffcccc"
| 43
| February 3
| Sacramento
| L 85–94
|
|
|
| The Palace of Auburn Hills
| 22–21
|- align="center" bgcolor="#ffcccc"
| 44
| February 5
| @ New York
| L 91–97
|
|
|
| Madison Square Garden
| 22–22
|- align="center" bgcolor="#ccffcc"
| 45
| February 7
| Orlando
| W 97–83
|
|
|
| The Palace of Auburn Hills
| 23–22
|- align="center" bgcolor="#ffcccc"
| 47
| February 15
| Chicago
| L 109–112 (OT)
|
|
|
| The Palace of Auburn Hills
| 24–23
|- align="center" bgcolor="#ffcccc"
| 50
| February 21
| New York
| L 110–113 (OT)
|
|
|
| The Palace of Auburn Hills
| 26–24
|- align="center" bgcolor="#ccffcc"
| 52
| February 25
| @ Portland
| W 93–81
|
|
|
| Rose Garden Arena
| 27–25
|- align="center" bgcolor="#ccffcc"
| 43
| February 26
| @ Sacramento
| W 93–78
|
|
|
| ARCO Arena
| 28–25
|- align="center" bgcolor="#ffcccc"
| 54
| February 28
| @ Seattle
| L 80–94
|
|
|
| KeyArena
| 28–26

|- align="center" bgcolor="#ccffcc"
| 55
| March 1
| @ Phoenix
| W 102–97
|
|
|
| America West Arena
| 29–26
|- align="center" bgcolor="#ccffcc"
| 57
| March 4
| Atlanta
| W 99–93
|
|
|
| The Palace of Auburn Hills
| 31–26
|- align="center" bgcolor="#ffcccc"
| 59
| March 7
| @ Chicago
| L 81–102
|
|
|
| United Center
| 32–27
|- align="center" bgcolor="#ccffcc"
| 62
| March 13
| Phoenix
| W 118–115
|
|
|
| The Palace of Auburn Hills
| 35–27
|- align="center" bgcolor="#ccffcc"
| 63
| March 15
| Cleveland
| W 80–69
|
|
|
| The Palace of Auburn Hills
| 36–27
|- align="center" bgcolor="#ffcccc"
| 65
| March 19
| @ Orlando
| L 91–113
|
|
|
| Orlando Arena
| 37–28
|- align="center" bgcolor="#ffcccc"
| 66
| March 20
| @ Miami
| L 93–102
|
|
|
| Miami Arena
| 37–29
|- align="center" bgcolor="#ffcccc"
| 68
| March 23
| @ Atlanta
| L 84–92
|
|
|
| The Omni
| 38–30
|- align="center" bgcolor="#ffcccc"
| 70
| March 30
| Miami
| L 85–95
|
|
|
| The Palace of Auburn Hills
| 39–31

|- align="center" bgcolor="#ffcccc"
| 77
| April 13
| @ Indiana
| L 86–91
|
|
|
| Market Square Arena
| 44–33
|- align="center" bgcolor="#ccffcc"
| 79
| April 17
| Indiana
| W 102–93
|
|
|
| The Palace of Auburn Hills
| 45–34
|- align="center" bgcolor="#ffcccc"
| 80
| April 18
| @ Chicago
| L 79–110
|
|
|
| United Center
| 45–35
|- align="center" bgcolor="#ffcccc"
| 81
| April 20
| @ Cleveland
| L 73–75
|
|
|
| Gund Arena
| 45–36

Playoffs

|-
|- align="center" bgcolor="#ffcccc"
| 1
| April 26
| @ Orlando
| L 92–112
| Grant Hill (21)
| Grant Hill (11)
| three players tied (4)
| Orlando Arena17,248
| 0–1
|- align="center" bgcolor="#ffcccc"
| 2
| April 28
| @ Orlando
| L 77–92
| Allan Houston (23)
| Otis Thorpe (16)
| Otis Thorpe (3)
| Orlando Arena17,248
| 0–2
|- align="center" bgcolor="#ffcccc"
| 3
| April 30
| Orlando
| L 98–101
| Allan Houston (33)
| Otis Thorpe (13)
| Joe Dumars (7)
| The Palace of Auburn Hills20,386
| 0–3
|-

Player statistics

Regular season

Playoffs

Player Statistics Citation:

Awards and records
Grant Hill, All-NBA Second Team

Transactions

 September 20, 1995: Traded Randolph Childress and Bill Curley to the Portland Trail Blazers for Otis Thorpe.
 October 5, 1995: Signed Steve Bardo as a free agent.
 December 29, 1995: Waived Walter Bond.
 January 5, 1996: Waived Steve Bardo.
 January 31, 1996: Signed Michael Curry to the first of two consecutive 10-day contracts.
 February 22, 1996: Signed Michael Curry for the remainder of the season.

Player Transactions Citation:

References

See also
1995–96 NBA season

Detroit Pistons seasons
Detroit
Detroit
Detroit